Blatnica can refer to:

 Blatnica, Slovakia
 Blatnica, Bjelovar-Bilogora County, a village near Štefanje, Croatia
 Blatnica Pokupska, a village near Karlovac, Croatia
 Blatnica (Čitluk), a village in the municipality of Čitluk, Bosnia and Herzegovina

See also
Blatnick